Martin Preiss (born 18 September 1978) is a Czech cinematographer, writer and director.

Life and career
Preiss was born in Prague, Czechoslovakia (now Czech Republic). He studied at Film and TV School of the Academy of Performing Arts in Prague (FAMU) and gained a Masters in cinematography in 2008. He is a member of the Czech Society Of Cinematographers (ACK), and was a Member of Presidium of this organisation. He has made a number of feature films, short films and commercials including the 2004 comedy-horror film Choking Hazard, 2008 comedy Grapes, and 2009 comedy Little Knights Tale.

Awards and nominations
 He received the award for Best Cinematography at the California Independent Film Festival in 2010, for A Son's War 
He was nominated for Golden Tadpole at Camerimage and Best technical contribution at the 2008 Qantas Film and Television Awards for his work on the short film Cargo.
He was nominated for a Czech Society of Cinematographers Award for feature film Little Knights Tale.

Family
He is the nephew of Czech actors Viktor Preiss and Jana Preissová.

References

1978 births
Living people
Czech cinematographers
Czech film directors